D'arcy Elizabeth Wretzky-Brown (born May 1, 1968) is an American musician. She is the original bass player of the alternative rock band the Smashing Pumpkins and is credited on their first six studio albums. She left the band in 1999.

Biography

Early life 
Wretzky was born and raised in South Haven, Michigan, where her mother, Vikke Anderson, a working musician, encouraged D'arcy and her sisters to perform music. Growing up, she played the violin and oboe and performed in choirs. She also performed gymnastics. Wretzky intended to start a musical career since she was 10 years old. She would later refer to her father, Jerry Wretzky, a pipefitter with a love of horseback riding, as "a very strange man". The young Wretzky was a self-described "tomboy", and had a contentious relationship with her sister.
Wretzky suffered from severe stage fright during her childhood. 

She attended South Haven's L.C. Mohr High School, where she grew interested in post-punk and played in cover bands. After high school, she moved to France to join a band, but the band had already disbanded upon her arrival, prompting her to return to the United States, where she then moved to Chicago and later joined the Smashing Pumpkins.
Wretzky stated that she is a self-taught bass player.

Wretzky's hyphenated name, "Wretzky-Brown", comes from her having been married to musician Kerry Brown, from 1993 to 1999. According to Wretzky, she had a miscarriage in 1999.

1988–1999: Smashing Pumpkins 
After a concert at a local rock club, Wretzky overheard Billy Corgan criticizing the band that had performed. An argument and discussion followed, and Corgan recruited her into his band, the nascent Smashing Pumpkins, which, at the time, was merely Corgan and James Iha, and they used a drum machine. Wretzky accepted, and Jimmy Chamberlin completed the lineup a few months later, after Joe Shanahan encouraged Corgan to add a live drummer.

Wretzky is the credited bassist on the Smashing Pumpkins' first five studio albums: Gish, Siamese Dream, Mellon Collie and the Infinite Sadness, Adore, and Machina/The Machines of God. It was confirmed by both her and Corgan, however, that Corgan played the bass tracks on Gish and Siamese Dream. Wretzky often contributed backing vocals on some songs on studio albums and in concert. She contributes vocally in Smashing Pumpkins songs such as "Daydream" from Gish, many songs on Siamese Dream, "1979", "Cupid De Locke", "Farewell and Goodnight", "Beautiful"; "Where Boys Fear to Tread" from Mellon Collie, and "Dreaming" and "The Bells" from The Aeroplane Flies High. Wretzky also co-wrote the Smashing Pumpkins song "Daughter".

In 1995, Wretzky and Iha started an independent record label called Scratchie Records, featuring artists such as The Frogs.

1999: Final tour, recording sessions and leaving the band 
Wretzky's time in the band was marked by alternating periods of happiness and discomfort. Corgan considered her the "moral authority" and "moral conscience" of the band. In the aftermath of the success of 1995's Mellon Collie and the Infinite Sadness, Corgan said she began an "apparent slow descent into insanity and/or drugs (take your pick)." After the short, nine-date "The Arising!" tour in April 1999 which saw all four original members performing together for the first time since 1996, Wretzky decided to leave the band with intentions of pursuing an acting career. The band was recording Machina/The Machines of God and Machina II/The Friends and Enemies of Modern Music at the time and consequently she performed very few bass parts on the album. Most of the bass parts were handled by Corgan himself. Shortly after leaving the group, she was arrested for possession of crack cocaine. Corgan later commented she was "fired for being a mean-spirited drug addict who refused to get help." She was replaced on 2000's Machina tours by former Hole bassist Melissa Auf der Maur.

1999–present: Life after the Smashing Pumpkins 
Wretzky did not participate in the Smashing Pumpkins' reunion. In 2008, she and her former boyfriend and bandmate James Iha filed a lawsuit against Virgin Records for selling ringtones of Smashing Pumpkins songs without their consent.

After many years out of the spotlight, Wretzky resurfaced in July 2009 by calling in unexpectedly on Chicago's Q101 FM with Ryan Manno. During the interview, she stated that she was not healthy enough to be a musician, and repeatedly professed her admiration for Monkees frontman Davy Jones who was known to be an early romantic crush of Wretzky's. She also discussed her appreciation for the band Silversun Pickups who have a sound influenced by the early Gish era of the Smashing Pumpkins. She also mentioned that she then lived on a farm in Michigan, that she had briefly lived in Austin, Texas, sometime during the previous decade, and that her former fiancé Wendell Green had died.

Wretzky was jailed on February 1, 2011, for missing four court dates related to a ticket she received for failing to control her wild horses, allowing them to freely roam the streets at night causing interference to local traffic and farmers, as well as trespassing on public property and stealing vegetables from the local farmer's market storage. She spent six days in jail. The following day after getting released from jail, she was arrested again on February 7, 2011, on a misdemeanor drunken-driving road rage charge in South Haven, Michigan. She was sent back to jail.

In 2013, Wretzky's relationship with Corgan remained tense, with both parties saying that they were not speaking. In September 2014, she tried to re-establish contact with him, but Corgan had changed his phone number.

In August 2016, Corgan posted a video to Facebook stating that he and Wretzky had recently reestablished communication saying "I've been in communication with D'arcy for the first time in 16 or 17 years, it's awesome to have my friend back." Corgan emphasized that this did not necessarily mean the band was getting back together, instead insisting "my primary interest in the old band was us having good relationships again."

On February 14, 2018, Wretzky gave her first interview in nearly 20 years. In it, she was highly critical of Corgan and their past.

Wretzky stated she had been offered a contract to rejoin the band on the Shiny and Oh So Bright tour, but that Corgan rescinded the offer soon after. Corgan released a statement denying the claims, stating "Ms. Wretzky has repeatedly been invited out to play with the group, participate in demo sessions, or at the very least, meet face-to-face, and in each and every instance she always deferred". Wretzky later provided screenshots of a text message conversation with Corgan that appeared to support her version of the story.

Other musical work 
Wretzky joined the band Catherine as a second vocalist for their final album, Hot Saki and Bedtime Stories. She also appeared in the video for Four Leaf Clover. At the time, Wretzky was married to Catherine member Kerry Brown.

Wretzky contributed vocals to the track "One and Two" on James Iha's 1998 solo album, Let It Come Down.

In 1999, she worked with cellist Eric Remschneider, whom she had worked with when he had recorded with the Smashing Pumpkins. That year, she also contributed backing vocals on the Filter song "Cancer" from Title of Record.

In May 2016 in an interview with Loudwire, Filter lead singer Richard Patrick spoke of a romantic relationship he had with Wretzky, saying she was the subject of a song he wrote called "Miss Blue", also on Title of Record.

While making no indication that she will record with or make any meaningful contribution, Michigan doom-sludge metal band Grave Next Door said on Twitter that they were jamming with D'arcy in her home, with one band member posting a pic of himself with a prop from the video for "Tonight Tonight".

References

External links 

1968 births
American alternative rock musicians
American rock bass guitarists
Women bass guitarists
Living people
Guitarists from Michigan
People from South Haven, Michigan
The Smashing Pumpkins members
Alternative rock bass guitarists
20th-century American guitarists
Grammy Award winners
20th-century American women guitarists